Barış Alıcı (born 24 June 1997) is a Turkish professional footballer who plays as a winger for Samsunspor.

Club career
On 11 June 2018, Alıcı transferred to Fenerbahçe from Altınordu. He made his professional debut for Fenerbahçe in a 1–0 Champions League qualifier against S.L. Benfica on 7 August 2018.

On 13 January 2019, he joined Yeni Malatyaspor on loan for the rest of the season.

On 28 January 2020, he moved to Westerlo on a 1.5-year loan deal.

International career
Alıcı represented the Turkey U20 at the 2018 Toulon Tournament.

Personal life
Alıcı is the twin brother of the footballer Kerim Alıcı.

Career statistics

Club

References

External links
 
 
 
 
 Fenerbahçe profile

1997 births
Living people
People from Bornova
Twin sportspeople
Turkish footballers
Association football fullbacks
Association football midfielders
Turkey youth international footballers
Süper Lig players
TFF First League players
Challenger Pro League players
Fenerbahçe S.K. footballers
Çaykur Rizespor footballers
Yeni Malatyaspor footballers
K.V.C. Westerlo players
Gençlerbirliği S.K. footballers
Samsunspor footballers
Turkish expatriate footballers
Turkish expatriate sportspeople in Belgium
Expatriate footballers in Belgium
Footballers from İzmir